Mykhailo Polyanychko (1921 – 19??) – Ukrainian politician and diplomat, Ambassador Extraordinary and Plenipotentiary. Permanent Representative of Ukraine to the United Nations.

Professional career and experience 
His career was closely linked to the Ministry of Foreign Affairs, where he headed the Department of International Organizations Ministry of Foreign Affairs, was Deputy Minister of Foreign Affairs of the Ukrainian SSR. Since 1957 was a member of Ukrainian delegations to the UN General Assembly nine times. While working in Ministry of Foreign Affairs had the opportunity to meet foreign delegations visiting the Ukrainian capital Kyiv. The UN, he was elected chairman of the Eastern European Group of the United Nations, and in early 1968 acted as a spokesman for the group in an address to the UN Secretary General in the interests of East Germany, who was not a member of the United Nations.

From 1968 to 1973 – he was permanent representative of the Ukrainian Soviet Socialist Republic to the United Nations.

Diplomatic rank 
 Ambassador Extraordinary and Plenipotentiary

References

External links 
 Chronicle: Ukraine to the United Nations
 Handbook of the history of the Communist Party and the Soviet Union 1898 – 1991
 UNITED NATIONS SECURITY COUNCIL OFFICIAL RECORDS THIRTY-NINTH YEAR 2542nd MEETING: 25 MAY 1984 NEW YORK
 Diplomacy in the Former Soviet Republics James P. Nichol Greenwood Publishing Group, 1.01.1995 – 244.
 Ukraine's U.N. Mission celebrates 40th anniversary

1921 births
Permanent Representatives of Ukraine to the United Nations
Communist Party of Ukraine (Soviet Union) politicians
Possibly living people
Soviet people